Pancalia aureatus is a moth in the family Cosmopterigidae. It was described by C.K. Yang in 1977. It is found in Beijing, China.

References

Natural History Museum Lepidoptera generic names catalog

Moths described in 1977
Antequerinae